The Mayor of Kumanovo is the Mayor of the Kumanovo Municipality, Macedonia.

List of mayors of Kumanovo

Council
The current council was elected in 2013. It has 33 members.
 12 council members are from SDSM (to include the President of the Council)
 12 council members are from VMRO DPMNE
 4 council members are from DUI
 2 council members are from  DPA
 1 council member is from NDR
 2 council members are independently elected

Timeline of Kumanovo mayors

History

See also

President of the Council of Kumanovo Municipality
List of presidents of Council of Kumanovo Municipality

References

Mayors of Kumanovo